Group B of the 2023 Africa Cup of Nations qualification tournament is one of the twelve groups that will decide the two teams that shall qualify for the 2023 Africa Cup of Nations. The group consists of four teams: Burkina Faso, Cape Verde, Togo and Eswatini.

The teams shall play against each other in a home-and-away round-robin format, between 3 June 2022 and March 2023.

Standings

Matches

Goalscorers

References

Group B